Lillis may refer to:

People 
 Stefan Åkesson, Swedish skateboarder

Surname 
 Bob Lillis (born 1930), American baseball player
 Jason Lillis (born 1969), English footballer
 Josh Lillis (born 1987), English footballer
 Leandros Lillis (born 1996), Cypriot footballer
 Mark Lillis (born 1960), English footballer
 Rachael Lillis (born 1978), American actress
 Sophia Lillis (born 2002), American actress 
 Stephen Lillis (born 1986), Irish hurler
 Thomas Francis Lillis (1861–1938), American Roman Catholic prelate

Places 
 Lillis, Kansas
 Lillis Business Complex, on the University of Oregon campus

See also
Lilli (disambiguation)